Daniel Lawrence Finn (May 29, 1928 – February 18, 2007) was an American professional basketball player. Finn played three years for the NBA's Philadelphia Warriors.  He attended St. John's University.

External links
Career statistics
Danny Finn's obituary

1928 births
2007 deaths
American men's basketball players
Basketball players from New York City
Philadelphia Warriors players
Point guards
Shooting guards
Sportspeople from Brooklyn
St. John's Red Storm men's basketball players
Undrafted National Basketball Association players
Wilkes-Barre Barons players